Jerry Lee Long is a former Republican member of the Illinois House of Representatives, representing the 76th district which includes Bureau, LaSalle, Putnam and Livingston counties in north central Illinois from 2017 to 2019.

In the 2018 general election, Long was defeated for a second term by Democratic candidate Lance Yednock, a business representative with International Union of Operating Engineers Local 150.

References

External links
 Profile at Illinois General Assembly

Republican Party members of the Illinois House of Representatives
Living people
Year of birth missing (living people)